Hired to Kill may refer to:

The Italian Connection, a 1972 Italian film also released under the title 'Hard to Kill'
Hired to Kill (1990 film), a 1990 action film